The Aleko Konstantinov State Satirical Theatre (Darzhaven satirichen teatar „Aleko Konstantinov“), commonly known as the Satirical Theatre, is a theatre in Sofia, Bulgaria, located on Georgi Rakovski Street, known as "Sofia Broadway". It was established in 1957 and named after writer Aleko Konstantinov, author of the satirical series Bay Ganyo. From 1974, the theatre put on a very successful production of Stanislav Stratiev's The Roman Bath, which was put on for more than ten years. In 2005 the theatre put on a production of Ana Vaseva's D.L..

References

Theatres in Sofia
1957 establishments in Bulgaria
Theatres completed in 1957